Paradiestus is a genus of South American corinnid sac spiders first described by Cândido Firmino de Mello-Leitão in 1915. It was considered a synonym of Corinna from 1925 to 2000.

Species
 it contains five species, all found in Brazil:
Paradiestus aurantiacus Mello-Leitão, 1915 (type) – Brazil
Paradiestus egregius (Simon, 1896) – Brazil
Paradiestus giganteus (Karsch, 1880) – Brazil
Paradiestus penicillatus (Mello-Leitão, 1939) – Brazil
Paradiestus vitiosus (Keyserling, 1891) – Brazil

References

Araneomorphae genera
Corinnidae
Spiders of Brazil
Taxa named by Cândido Firmino de Mello-Leitão